The Zawiya Dila'iya or Zawiya of Dila was a Sufi brotherhood, centred in the Middle Atlas range of Morocco.

Origin
There were originally two zawiyas referred to as Dila'. The first zawiya was founded by Abu Bakr ibn Muhammad al-Majjati al-Sanhaji (1537–1612), a Sanhaja Berber of the Mjjat tribe, a branch of the Ait Idrassen confederation. He was a follower of the famous Sufi mystic Muhammad al-Jazuli, who founded the Jazuliyya branch of the Shad̲h̲iliyya order. This first zawiya was established towards 1566 and located near the qsur of M'ammar, about 10 kilometres southeast of Ait Ishaq (in today's Khenifra Province). Under the leadership of Muhammad ibn Abu Bakr, the brotherhood was able to establish itself in the Berber territory of the Middle Atlas and High Atlas mountain ranges. The zawiya was initially supported by the ruling Saadi dynasty, who were themselves partisans of the Jazuliyya. 

As the Saadi state in Morocco declined and descended into disorder, the Dila'iyya Zawiya grew in both wealth and political prominence, providing refuge to students leaving the traditional urban centres and accumulating its own rich library. In 1638, under the leadership of Abu Bakr's grandson Muhammad al-Hajj, a second zawiya was founded at present-day Ait Ishaq to serve as an expanded headquarters for the organization. This new site, which had its own walls, mosques, and palaces, announced the zawiya's rising power and its growing political rivalry with the Saadi dynasty.

Rise in power 
At the beginning of Zawiya following the period of anarchy which followed the death of the Sultan Ahmad al-Mansur in 1603 and the accession to the throne of Mawlay Zaydan in 1613, several regions of Morocco escaped the control of the central Saadi state:

 the plains of the northwest, from the Atlantic coast to Taza, controlled by the marabout al-Ayachi;
 the Republic of Salé, erected as an independent state by the Moriscos;
 Tetuan, city-state governed by the Naqsis family;
 the Tafilalet, under the control of the Alawites.

The zawiya of Dila' then appeared, under the impetus of Muhammad al-Hajj, since its foundation, as a movement combining spirituality and politics, mixing the ideology of holiness and sharifism with aspirations for power by the Berbers. It took advantage of the weakness of Saadi power and the fragmentation of the country to extend its influence and control over several towns and regions in the north and center of Morocco. From 1637 onwards, the brotherhood started with the conquest of large parts of northern Morocco. By 1641, they had conquered Meknes, Fez and the port of Salé; from where a rival marabout, al-Ayashi, was expelled, and assassinated on 30 April 1641. In Fez, the Saadi family was expelled and Muhammad al-Hajj (1635–1688) was proclaimed sultan.

Peak 
The Zawiya of Dila reached its peak in the middle of the 17th century, after having ordered the assassination of al-Ayashi in 1641, expanding its influence on the cities of Fez, Tetuan and Ksar el-Kebir and on Republic of Salé, as well as on the plains of the north-west and the corridor of Taza to the Moulouya.

Occupation of Fes 
Muhammad al-Haj, head of the zawiya, thus governed Fes since 1641 and was proclaimed sultan there in 1659, following the death of the last Saadi sultan Ahmad al-Abbas. 

This time was particularly difficult for the Jewish community of Fes, who through institutions such as Tujjar as-Sultan, had important ties with the Sharifi Saadi Makhzen. A Jewish chronicle of the time refers to Muhammad al-Haj as the "sodomite of the zawiya" and recounts that in 1646 synagogues were ordered to close and were subsequently desecrated, damaged, or destroyed.

The city was not receptive to the Dilā' either, and for a brief period in 1651 they rebelled and invited Muhammad ibn Muhammad al-Sharif, one of the early Alaouite sultans, to take control of the city.

The Zawiya of Dila lost Fez in 1661 following the putch of Caid Al Doraidi. It was dismantled in 1668 by the Alawites, who took the ascendancy and undertook the reunification of Morocco.

Collapse
The Dila'ites ruled over central and northern Morocco until 1668, when Dila' itself was annexed by the shurafa Alawites, after their initial conquest of Fez.

References 

Sufi organizations
Sufism in Morocco
Sanhaja
Zawiyas